Essen-Eiberg station is a station in the district of Eiberg of the city of Essen in the German state of North Rhine-Westphalia. It is on the Witten/Dortmund–Oberhausen/Duisburg railway.

History 

The name of the station refers to the former municipality of Eiberg, which extended over the western parts of modern Bochum and the eastern parts of the Essen suburbs of Freisenbruch and Horst. At the end of the 1960s the station was established lies in the southeastern part of Freisenbruch on the Witten/Dortmund–Oberhausen/Duisburg railway, which is part of the main east–west trunk line of the Ruhr, opened in this area in 1874.

Current situation 

The station is only served by line S1 of the Rhine-Ruhr S-Bahn and lies on the Witten/Dortmund–Oberhausen/Duisburg railway (timetable route 450.1). In Deutsche Bahn's directory of operating points, the station is given the abbreviation of EEIB and it is classified by Deutsche Bahn as a category 5 station.

Rail services 

The station is served by S1 of the Rhine-Ruhr S-Bahn (Dortmund–Solingen) on week days every 15 minutes during the day between Dortmund and Essen.

It is also served by three bus routes, operated by Ruhrbahn at 10 or 20 minute intervals: 164, 174 and 184.

Notes

Rhine-Ruhr S-Bahn stations
S1 (Rhine-Ruhr S-Bahn)
Railway stations in Essen
Railway stations in Germany opened in 1968
1968 establishments in West Germany